Strongylocentrotus pallidus or Pale sea urchin is a species of sea urchin found in rocky areas in Norway, off Russia from the Barents Sea down to the central part of the Sea of Japan.

References

External links
 
 

pallidus